Alfred Hsing (born November 23, 1983) is an American martial artist, actor, and stuntman. After over a decade of intensive training in both America and China, Hsing won the first American gold medal in wushu taolu history at the 2009 World Wushu Championships held in Toronto, Ontario, Canada. Earlier that year he made the US National Wushu Team where he was ranked 1st in the nation. Along with his career in martial arts, Hsing is also recognized as the Shaolin Expert on Spike TV's show Deadliest Warrior.

Early life 
On November 23, 1983, Hsing was born in San Jose, California. Hsing is of Taiwanese descent.

Wushu career
As a child Hsing always loved martial arts and would play fight with his brother. At the age of 15 he started formal training in Shaolin kung fu and wushu. Soon after he began learning wushu Hsing quickly won gold at his first local tournament. Some accomplishments include:
 2000 Martial Arts World Cup Grand Champion
 2001 CMAT Grand Champion (13-17 Division)
 Gold at the 2005 US Wushu Nationals
 2007 USAWKF Wushu Taolu C Team
 First place in straight sword and spear Taiwan National Qualifiers
 2008 San Diego Grand Internationals Grand Champion
 2008 CMAT Tournament Grand Champion (All-Around)
 2009 USAWKF Wushu Taolu A Team
 Gold at the 2009 Tiger Claw Shark City Nationals
 Gold at the 2009 10th World Wushu Championships

In 2007, Hsing made the C Team of the USAWKF National Wushu Taolu Team. He spent the next two years vigorously training and made the A Team at the next team trials in 2009. At the 2009 World Wushu Championships in Toronto, Hsing became the first American athlete to win a gold medal in a taolu event, which he did so in the male jianshu event. A year later in 2010, he took part in the changquan event at the 2010 World Combat Games as his last Wushu competition. After this, he began to focus on his acting and stunting career.

Though Alfred Hsing has learned many styles of martial arts through his years of training, his main events are Changquan (Longfist), Jianshu (Straight Sword), and Qiangshu (Spear). He is also proficient in drunken fist, drunken sword, whip chain, emei daggers, fan, broadsword, staff, taijiquan, and Taijijian.

Hsing has been featured in Kung Fu Magazine and Masters Magazine (Winter 09) for his significant accomplishments in martial arts.

Business career
After graduating from UCLA with a degree in economics, Computer Specialization, and minor in East Asian Languages, Hsing began work at Big 4 accounting firm KPMG. After gaining professional experience at KPMG, Hsing moved on to get a job in finance at City National Bank. In 2009, he quit his job to focus on training for the World Wushu Championships.

Acting career
Hsing has appeared on TV shows and films such as Ready Player One, HBO's Silicon Valley, NCIS: LA, CSI: NY, The Last Ship, Spike TV's Deadliest Warrior, and even in a Bollywood movie called Aakhari Decision.

Hsing has worked with Jet Li in The Sorcerer and the White Snake, Stephen Chow (whom he interviewed for MTV for the release of Kung Fu Hustle), MMA star Cung Le (whom he interviewed at the LA film festival for Bodyguards and Assassins), and Jackie Chan, whom he worked for as part of the Jackie Chan stunt team on Dragon Blade and demoed for at the premiere of The Spy Next Door.

References

External links

 
 
 Alfred Hsing documentary at Jet Li's official website

Living people
University of California, Los Angeles alumni
1983 births
American people of Chinese descent
American wushu practitioners
American stunt performers
American male actors
Sportspeople from San Jose, California
Taiwanese wushu practitioners